Gerdik Naser (also Romanized as Gerdīk Nāşer and Gerdīknāşer; also known as Gerdaknāşer) is a village in Margavar Rural District, Silvaneh District, Urmia County, West Azerbaijan Province, Iran. At the 2006 census, its population was 301, in 52 families.

References 

Populated places in Urmia County